Otter Creek is the name of a settlement in the municipality of Tweed, Hastings County, Ontario, Canada. Otter Creek, a tributary of the Clare River in the Moira River drainage basin, flows through the community.

References

Communities in Hastings County